Indrek Ojari (born on 9 October 1977 in Tallinn) is an Estonian actor.

In 2000 he graduated from Estonian Academy of Music and Theatre. Since 2004 he is working at Tallinn City Theatre.

Selected filmography
 2002: Names in Marble (film) (feature film; role (minor): Reinok)
 2003–2008: Kodu keset linna (television series; role: Sten)
 2011: IT-planeet (educational TV science fiction comedy; role: alien)
 2018: Võta või jäta (feature film; role: Toomas)
 2019: Vanamehe film (animated film; roles: lumberjack Indrek (voice) and rooster (voice))
 2020: Rain (feature film; role: Rain)
 2020: O2 (feature film; role: Andres Piirisild)
 2021: Süü (television series; role: Detective Kaarma)

Awards
 2020: annual awards by Cultural Endowment of Estonia: Best Actor
2014 : Actor Award

References

External links

Living people
1977 births
Estonian male stage actors
Estonian male television actors
Estonian male film actors
21st-century Estonian male actors
Estonian Academy of Music and Theatre alumni
Male actors from Tallinn